"The New Office" (also known as "Monster Machines" and as "Moving Day") is an episode of the British comedy television series The Goodies. Written by The Goodies, with songs and music by Bill Oddie.

Plot
The Goodies' office is being renovated, but the builders are taking a very long time to finish their work.  This is hardly surprising when it is discovered that the builders have not done any work at all for months.  The builders have been spending the last six months drinking tea and playing cards.  The office is extremely noisy because a recording of construction work is being played to make it appear that the men are working.

The Goodies are upset at the lack of work being done.  The workmen retaliate by walking off the job, vowing never to return.  However, they leave a memento of their visit behind by smashing up the office and destroying it utterly.

With their office in ruins, the Goodies try to buy a building to be their new office, but buildings are extremely expensive.  Then they try to buy a block of land on which a new office can be built.  However, vacant land is very scarce — and what is left to buy is also very expensive and very small in size.

The Goodies eventually decide a disused railway station office would be best — and set about building one.  One of the pluses is the fact that the new office is a mobile one and can be towed anywhere by the Goodies' trandem — something which is helpful when their peaceful surrounds are suddenly filled with people, houses and railway lines.  People also mistakenly think that the Goodies' disused railway station office is a real railway station office, and try to buy train tickets from them.

Towing their office behind them, the Goodies park on some peaceful land, and begin to settle down.  However, Tim, Graeme and Bill discover some unexpected terrifying aspects of some heavy construction machinery parked near their office, and the Goodies become embroiled in battle with the heavy machines until they find a solution to the problem.

References

 "The Complete Goodies" — Robert Ross, B T Batsford, London, 2000
 "The Goodies Rule OK" — Robert Ross, Carlton Books Ltd, Sydney, 2006
 "From Fringe to Flying Circus — 'Celebrating a Unique Generation of Comedy 1960-1980'" — Roger Wilmut, Eyre Methuen Ltd, 1980
 "The Goodies Episode Summaries" — Brett Allender
 "The Goodies — Fact File" — Matthew K. Sharp

External links
 

The Goodies (series 3) episodes
1973 British television episodes